J. J. in Person! is an album recorded "in concert" by the J. J. Johnson Quintet which was released on the Columbia label. This is a studio recording, but some release of the album, including the original release, feature over-dubbed applause and faked bandstand announcements.

Reception

Allmusic awarded the album 3 stars.

Track listing
 "Tune Up" (Miles Davis) - 5:40
 "Laura" (David Raksin, Johnny Mercer) - 4:57
 "Walkin'" (Richard Carpenter) - 6:51
 "What Is This Thing Called Love?" (Cole Porter) - 6:30
 "Misterioso" (Thelonious Monk) - 6:57
 "My Old Flame" (Sam Coslow, Arthur Johnston) - 3:45
 "Now's The Time" (Charlie Parker) - 8:11

Personnel
J. J. Johnson – trombone
Nat Adderley – cornet (tracks 1-5 & 7)
Tommy Flanagan – piano
Wilbur Little – bass
Albert Heath – drums

References

Columbia Records albums
J. J. Johnson albums
1958 albums
Albums produced by George Avakian